Bence Balogh (born 4 October 1991, in Budapest) is a professional Hungarian footballer currently plays for Vasas SC. He also appeared in the 2019 film K-12 by Melanie Martinez as Jason.

Club statistics

Updated to games played as of 7 December 2012.

External links
 HLSZ 
 MLSZ 

1991 births
Living people
Footballers from Budapest
Hungarian footballers
Association football forwards
Vasas SC players
21st-century Hungarian people